Jack Crain (January 7, 1920 – October 22, 1994) was a football player for the University of Texas at Austin who later served three terms in the Texas House of Representatives.  He was named an All Southwest Conference player in 1939 and 1940, and was twice selected All-American.

High school
Crain grew up in Nocona, Texas, where he was known as the Nocona Nugget.  During high school, he scored 258 points, and his team won a Class B regional title. Crain's football talents were gaining attention in the media; consequently, he was selected to play in the 1938 Oil Bowl (high school). Fifty-six years later, he would be inducted in the Oil Bowl (high school) Hall of Fame. Jack Crain Football Stadium of the Nocona Independent School District is now named for him.

College career
Coach Dana X. Bible thought that Jack (Jackrabbit) Crain helped lay the foundation for the University of Texas at Austin Longhorn's rise from mediocrity to preeminence in the late 1930s.  In the game between the Longhorns and Razorbacks in October 1939, Crain an unknown sophomore, ran a quick kick back to help UT later score from seven yards out. Late in the game with only under 30 seconds to play, Crain caught a flip-out pass and ran 67 yards untouched and scored a touchdown to tie the game at 13–13. Finally, as the clock ran out Crain kicked the extra point himself for the 14–13 win.  This game became known as the Renaissance Game in Texas football history and the win is credited for revitalizing the football program once again.   At the University of Texas, Crain set records that still stand today.

After college
When Crain's college career ended, he joined the U.S. Navy as an officer in World War II.  Following the war, he returned to Nocona, where he lived for the rest of his life.  His celebrity status helped him to be elected to three terms in the Texas House of Representatives from District 61.

In 1978, his wife, Jean Crain, was killed when a building in downtown Nocona collapsed from a heavy accumulation of snow.  This event provided the impetus for Crain to found a church called Jean's Men's Bible Class.  This nondenominational church, named after his wife, is still active today.  Crain died October 22, 1994, at the age of 74.

References

External links
MackBrown-TexasFootball.Com
Nocona Community Web
The Nocona Cowboy by Ray Schmidt
Bill Little's Commentary (MackBrown-TexasFootball.Com)
Nocona Chamber of Commerce Web
Tulsa World Sports Extra
Oil Bowl Web
NHS Grad Flirted With Heisman
Longhorns Men's Athletic Hall of Fame
H.R. No. 26, Texas House of Representatives Bill
Jack Crain's Playbook

1920 births
1994 deaths
Texas Longhorns football players
Members of the Texas House of Representatives
20th-century American politicians
People from Nocona, Texas